Anu Emmanuel (born 28 March 1996) is an American actress of Indian descent who appears in Telugu films and occasionally in Tamil films.

She debuted as a heroine in the 2016 Malayalam film Action Hero Biju. She made her Telugu debut with Majnu (2016), and went on to act in other Telugu films, like Kittu Unnadu Jagratha (2017), Oxygen, and Agnyaathavaasi (2018). Emmanuel has also worked in Tamil films, making her debut with the suspense thriller Thupparivaalan (2017).

Early life
Anu Emmanuel was born on 28 March 1996 to a Malayali Catholic family in Chicago, Illinois, United States. She is the daughter of Thankachan Emmanuel, a noted Malayalam film producer. Her family lives in Dallas, Texas. She lived throughout the US and later moved to India to pursue acting. Malayali actress Reba Monica John is her cousin.

Career
Emmanuel made her acting debut as lead in Nivin Pauly starrer Action Hero Biju, directed by Abrid Shine. She made her Telugu debut with Majnu opposite to Nani. The film went on become a hit at box-office. During that time she was announced as the female lead in Oxygen, alongside actor Gopichand in the lead. In 2017, She made her Tamil debut with Thupparivaalan alongside Vishal.

In 2018, she paired opposite to Pawan Kalyan in Agnyaathavaasi. She played the lead role in Shailaja Reddy Alludu along with Naga Chaitanya and Ramya Krishna. She made a cameo appearance in Geetha Govindam. She appeared in her second Tamil film Namma Veetu Pillai opposite to Sivakarthikeyan which became successful at the box-office.

Filmography

 All films are in Telugu, Unless otherwise noted

References

External links
 
 

Actresses in Malayalam cinema
Indian film actresses
Actresses from Kottayam
21st-century Indian actresses
Living people
Actresses from Chicago
Place of birth missing (living people)
Actresses in Tamil cinema
Actresses in Telugu cinema
1997 births
21st-century American women